Appu Chesi Pappu Koodu is a 1959 Indian Telugu-language comedy drama film directed by L. V. Prasad. The film was produced by Nagi Reddi and Chakrapani of Vijaya Productions; the latter co-wrote its script with Prasad and Vempati Sadasivabrahmam. It is the Telugu version of Prasad's Tamil film Kadan Vaangi Kalyaanam (1958). Starring N. T. Rama Rao and Savitri, Appu Chesi Pappu Koodu features Jaggayya, C. S. R. Anjaneyulu, S. V. Ranga Rao, and Jamuna in supporting roles. The conflict between two older men with different mindsetsRamadasu (an eternal, devious debtor) and Mukundarao (a generous, rich gentleman with fake prestige)is the film's centrepiece.

Production began after the success of Mayabazar (1957), with M. S. Chalapathi Rao and Jagannadham the film's executive producers. Marcus Bartley was the director of photography. S. Rajeswara Rao composed the soundtrack and background score. G. Kalyanasundaram and K. Radhakrishna edited the film, and Madhavapeddi Gokhale and Kaladhar were its art directors. The film is shown almost entirely in black and white, with the exception of a dance sequence filmed in Gevacolor.

Appu Chesi Pappu Koodu was released on 14 January 1959, during the Makara Sankranti festival season. With average returns during its first four weeks, the film eventually became an above-average grosser and its re-release was profitable. It has cult status in Telugu cinema, and is an acclaimed Prasad film. Goldstone Technologies announced that they would attempt to digitise the film in 2007, but abandoned the attempt three years later.

Plot 
Ramadasu, a devious zamindar who recently acquired the colonial title of Rao Bahadur, is a perennial debtor who believes in leading a luxurious life on credit. His shrewd, schizophrenic manager Bhaja Govindam placates angry creditors with false promises. Dewan Bahadur Mukunda Rao, a wealthy, generous zamindar, is searching for a royal bridegroom for his granddaughter Manjari. Ramadasu plans to marry his son Raghu, a doctor practising in London, to Manjari to pay his debts. Unbeknownst to his father, though, Raghu has married a woman named Leela.

Ramadasu first bribes Rao's manager, Ramalingam. Rao, unaware of the deception, agrees to the alliance. Manjari, who knows the truth, wants to stop the marriage. Leela's brother Raja, is released from prison after serving a sentence for his participation in the Indian independence movement. Raja and Manjari were lovers during their college days, and she tells him about Ramadasu's intentions. After Raghu arrives from London, Ramadasu misleads him into thinking that Leela has died.

When Raja asks Ramadasu to spare Leela, he sends his mobsters to attack him. Raja overpowers them, cornering Ramadasu later, and Leela stays in his home disguised as a mute maid. Govindam, fed up with Ramadasu, wants to expose his dishonesty to his creditors. Govindam's relationship with Ramalingam's daughter, Usha, is strained. Ramalingam's attempts to marry her off are thwarted by Govindam. To reunite Leela and Raghu, Raja disguises himself as Prince Bonkulamarri Raja and enters Rao's house aided by Govindam's schizophrenia. Rao is impressed with Raja and considers him a suitable bridegroom for Manjari, who is aware of and supports Raja's plans.

Raghu recognises Leela and is affectionate to her, which bothers Ramadasu. Despite his opposition to his father's intentions, Raghu continues to flirt with Manjari and play the prospective bridegroom. Raja and Govindam use several disguises in an attempt to expose Ramadasu's greed. Raghu introduces a foreign woman to Ramadasu as his demanding wife, who forces his father to incur more debt until he is cornered by his creditors. Ramalingam's deception is exposed, and Ramadasu apologises for his misdeeds. Raghu and Leela reconcile; Raja marries Manjari, and Govindam marries Usha.

Cast 
N. T. Rama Rao as Raja Rao
Savitri as Manjari
Jamuna as Leela
Jaggayya as Raghu
S. V. Ranga Rao as Mukunda Rao
C.S.R as Ramadasu
Relangi as Bhaja Govindam
Ramana Reddy as Ramalingam
Girija as Usha
Suryakantham as Rajaratnam
Mukkamala as Raghu's grandfather
R. Nageshwara Rao as Ramdin
Allu Ramalingaiah as Chidambara Shetty
Kasturi Siva Rao as Takku
Chadalavada as Chenchalayya
Balakrishna as Avataram
Padmanabham as Panakala Rao
Potti Prasad as a prospective groom

Production

Pre-production 
After the success of Mayabazar (1957), directed by K. V. Reddy, Nagi Reddi and Chakrapani of Vijaya Productions planned to make a contemporary film. Chakrapani came up with an idea about conflict between two older men who are polar opposites: one a debtor evading his creditors, and the other a wealthy gentleman with an inflated sense of prestige. L. V. Prasad was chosen to direct the film; he, Chakrapani and Vempati Sadasivabrahmam developed a script entitled Appu Chesi Pappu Koodu, after a popular Telugu idiom. It was the only film from Vijaya Productions with dialogue written by Sadasivabrahmam.

Film historian Randor Guy opines that Appu Chesi Pappu Koodu was a Telugu remake of Prasad's Tamil film Kadan Vaangi Kalyaanam (1958). Others such as Ashish Rajadhyaksha and Paul Willemen (authors of Encyclopedia of Indian Cinema), film scholar Swarnavel Eswaran Pillai, and M. L. Narasimhan of The Hindu believe that they were filmed simultaneously with different casts for different versions. Thanjai N. Ramaiah Dass wrote the dialogue for Kadan Vaangi Kalyaanam, and M. S. Chalapathi Rao and Jagannadham were the film's executive producers.

Casting and filming 
N. T. Rama Rao and Savitri were chosen for the lead roles, with Jaggayya, C. S. R. Anjaneyulu, S. V. Ranga Rao and Jamuna in supporting roles; Jamuna had no dialogue for most of the film. It was Rama Rao's 55th film as an actor, and Jaggayya's first film for Vijaya Productions. Jaggayya replaced Akkineni Nageswara Rao, who bowed out due to scheduling conflicts. Jaggayya had worked with Prasad as a voice artist for the Telugu-dubbed version of the director's Manohara (1954). Comedian Potti Prasad and Padmanabham made appearances as the prospective bridegrooms of Girija, who played Relangi fiancée; the former made his Telugu cinema debut with this film. Prasad, who received 1,116 for his single scene, praised Nagi Reddi and Chakrapani's generosity. Marcus Bartley was the director of photography. S. Rajeswara Rao composed the soundtrack and background score, assisted by Ogirala Ramachandra Rao and K. Prasada Rao. Ramachandra Rao's son, Narasimhamurthy, was cast as a child artiste. G. Kalyanasundaram and K. Radhakrishna edited the film, and Madhavapeddi Gokhale and Kaladhar were its art directors.

The success of Missamma (1955) encouraged Chakrapani to include a dream sequence, "Damayanti Swayamvaram", in which Rama Rao, Savitri and Jaggayya play Nala, Damayanti and Indra. Rama Rao had to shave his signature moustache for a scene, making Appu Chesi Pappu Koodu the only contemporary film in which he is clean-shaven. Another dance scene, "Aathmathyagam", was filmed by E. V. Saroja and Mikkilineni in Gevacolor; both were choreographed by Pasumarthi Krishnamurthy. Though the film is shown almost entirely in black and white, "Aathmathyagam" alone was filmed in colour. M. Pithambaram and T. P. Bhaktavatsalam provided the make-up. Appu Chesi Pappu Koodu was processed at the Vijaya Laboratory, and was recorded with the Westrex Sound System.

Music 
S. Rajeswara Rao composed the soundtrack of Appu Chesi Pappu Koodu, which has 15 songs (including poems). Pingali Nagendrarao wrote the lyrics. Sound mixing was supervised by A. Krishnan and V. Sivaram, processed by N. C. Sen Gupta and orchestrated by A. Krishnamurthy. Ghantasala provided vocals for Rama Rao and Ramaiah, and A. M. Rajah sang for Jaggayya's portions. P. Leela, P. Susheela, and Swarnalatha provided vocals for the actresses. "Echatinundi Veecheno" was based on the Mohana raga. For "Sundarangulanu Choosina Velana" Rajeswara Rao re-used the melody of "Brundavanamadi Andaridi Govindudu Andarivadele", which he wrote for Vijaya Productions' Missamma at Chakrapani's urging (a rare example of the composer recycling an earlier song).

Appu Chesi Pappu Koodu soundtrack was released in December 1959 on the Saregama label. "Kaseeki Poyanu Ramahari", "Echatinundi Veecheno", "Moogavaina Emile Nagumome" and "Cheyi Cheyi Kaluparave" became popular over the years; "Cheyi Cheyi Kaluparave" was parodied by the Indian National Congress as part of their election campaign during the 1989 general elections. The poem "Nava Kala Samithi" and other popular songs were played by keyboardist V. Seetharamaiah at the April 2013 Ghantasala Padya Sangeetha Vibhavari event at Kalabharathi Auditorium in Visakhapatnam.

Track listing

Release, reception and legacy 
Appu Chesi Pappu Koodu was released theatrically on 14 January 1959, during the Makara Sankranti festival season. With mediocre earnings during its first four weeks, the film became an above-average grosser. Its re-release was profitable, and it became a Telugu cult film.

According to M. L. Narasimham of The Hindu, Prasad's "deft handling" made the scenes "flow smoothly" despite the number of characters but the magic of Pelli Chesi Choodu (1952) and Missamma was missing from Appu Chesi Pappu Koodu. In their Encyclopedia of Indian Cinema, Ashish Rajadhyaksha and Paul Willemen wrote that the film "stages the victory of nationalist-modern alliance over decadent feudalism"; Ramaiah's scenes are its "most remarkable sections", giving a "semblance of unity" to a plot they found "barely coherent". K. Moti Gokulsing and Wimal Dissanayake wrote that Appu Chesi Pappu Koodu, Missamma, Gundamma Katha (1962) and Ramudu Bheemudu (1964) "represented the scope comedy had in the 1950s and 60s."

In September 2006, a postage stamp commemorating Prasad was issued in Hyderabad. M. L. Narasimham, in an article about the honour, listed Appu Chesi Pappu Koodu with Shavukaru (1950), Samsaram (1950), Pelli Chesi Choodu, Manohara, Missamma and others as acclaimed films by the director after the release of Mana Desam (1949) and his association with Vijaya Productions. Appu Chesi Pappu Koodu was one of the popular 1950s films featuring Ramana Reddy and Relangi Venkata Ramaiah, whom film historian Punnami Ravi Chandra termed the Laurel and Hardy of Telugu cinema at the time. Relangi Narasimha Rao 2008 comedy film of the same name, starring Rajendra Prasad, was a commercial failure.

Digitisation plans 
In late November 2007, Hyderabad-based Goldstone Technologies acquired the film-negative rights to 14 Telugu films produced by Vijaya Vauhini Studios (including Mayabazar  and Appu Chesi Pappu Koodu) to produce digitally-remastered versions in colour. Although the remastered, colourised version of Mayabazar was released in January 2010 and performed well in theatres, Goldstone decided not to remaster the remaining 13 films. According to the company, most of the producers who sold their negative rights to television networks relinquished control of them and the legal ownership and copyright issues proved insurmountable.

Notes

References

External links 
 

1959 comedy-drama films
1950s Telugu-language films
1959 films
Films directed by L. V. Prasad
Films scored by S. Rajeswara Rao
Indian black-and-white films
Indian comedy-drama films

1959 comedy films
1959 drama films